Sharon Millanta is an Australian cricketer. She played six One Day Internationals and four Twenty20 Internationals for the Australia national women's cricket team.

Cricket career
Millanta began playing cricket for the New South Wales Breakers in the 2000/01 season, playing in the Women's National Cricket League (WNCL). For the next ten years, she was in and out of the team while she also maintained another job as an occupational therapist. Millanta finally secured her place in the New South Wales side during the 2009/10 season.

In June 2011, a fortnight after he 31st birthday, Millanta was selected to play for the Australian national cricket team. The pay for female players was poor, and she received no compensation for the income she lost when she had to take leave from her other job. In 2011 and 2012, Millanta represented Australia in 10 international matches: 6 One Day Internationals and 4 Twenty20 Internationals. She played for Australia for the final time against India in March 2012.

Millanta retired from cricket after the 2013/14 season. She announced her decision to retire following New South Wales's victory in the February 2014 WNCL final, where she took one wicket.

References

External links

Living people
Australia women One Day International cricketers
Australia women Twenty20 International cricketers
1980 births